The 1970 United States Senate election in Utah was held on November 3, 1970. Incumbent Democratic Senator Frank Moss was re-elected to a third term in office, defeating Republican U.S. Representative Laurence J. Burton.

As of 2022, this is the last time the Democrats won a U.S. Senate election in Utah.

General election

Candidates
Laurence J. Burton, U.S. Representative from Ogden (Republican)
Clyde B. Freeman (American Independent)
Frank Moss, incumbent Senator since 1959 (Democratic)

Results

See also 
 1970 United States Senate elections

References 

1970
Utah
United States Senate